Chaney is a surname.

Chaney may also refer to:

People
Chaney family, Australian political family
Lon Chaney, U.S. acting family

People with the given name
Chaney Kley (1972-2007), U.S. actor
Chaney White (1894-1967), baseball player

Other
Chaney Glacier, in Montana, U.S.A.
Chaney High School, Youngstown, Ohio, U.S.A.
Hall–Chaney House, NRHP in Milwaukie, Oregon, U.S.A.

See also
Heckler v. Chaney, a U.S. Supreme Court case
 John Chaney (disambiguation)
 Chany, Russia
 Chanie, Poland
 Cheyne, a surname and given name
 Cheney (disambiguation)